The Emissary is a 1989 South African thriller film starring Ted Le Plat, Terry Norton, Robert Vaughn, André Jacobs, Patrick Mynhardt, Hans Strydom, Ken Gampu, Brian O'Shaughnessy, and Peter Krummeck. The film was written, produced, and directed by Jan Scholtz.

Plot
Jack Cavanaugh (Le Plat) learns that the KGB use his wife (Norton) to get access to a top secret computer system. He cannot see what to do except to take on the foreign agents himself.

Cast
 Ted Le Plat as Jack Cavanaugh (Credited as Ted Leplat)
 Terry Norton as Caroline Cavanaugh
 Robert Vaughn as Ambassador Ed MacKay
 André Jacobs as Hesse
 Patrick Mynhardt as Brochard
 Greg Latter as Walter Hennesy
 Jonathan Taylor as Christopher Fry
 Colin Sutcliffe as Matthew Holmes
 Hans Strydom as Justin Latimer
 Ken Gampu as Beamish
 Brian O'Shaughnessy as KGB General
 Peter Krummeck as Doctor

Production

Filming
The Emissary was filmed in South Africa in 1988.

Release
The Emissary was released in theatres on 21 April 1989. The film was released on VHS on 16 August 1989. The film can be streamed online by IFM Film Associates, Inc. The Emissary was released on DVD in the United Kingdom.

See also
 List of South African films
 List of African films

References

Sources

External links

1989 films
1980s English-language films
English-language South African films
1989 thriller films
South African thriller films